BePDF is a free software PDF reader for Haiku, BeOS, and magnussoft ZETA. It is based on Xpdf. It was added in Haiku R1 alpha 1 as its sole PDF reader.

The source code for BePDF is available via GitHub after a migration from SourceForge.

Features
BePDF supports the following features:

  Viewing of encrypted and password protected PDF 1.5 files.
 Opens file dropped on window.
 Navigation (with keyboard, toolbar, dragging with the mouse, mouse wheel).
 Support for hyperlinks within the file.
 Support for user-defined bookmarks for unencrypted files.
 Displays annotations.
 Zooming (in/out, selecting a rectangle with the mouse).
 Rotating the page.
 Can show a page list, bookmarks and attachments.
 Window mode or full-screen mode.
 Japanese, Chinese (simplified, traditional) and Korean font support.
 Renders embedded fonts (Type 1 and TrueType) with FreeType 2 library.
 Multithreaded (rendering is done in a separate thread).
 Editing (Annotations can be added to an unencrypted PDF file)
 File Attachment Annotations and Attachments can be saved.
 Printing (range of pages; even or odd pages only; reverse or in order).
 Searching text.
 Copying text or graphics (via drag and drop to other applications (e.g. Tracker) and into the clipboard).
 Session management for PDF files on BFS (open file with the settings when it was last closed).
 Information (about the file, security, fonts used).
 Localization for over 20 languages.

See also
 List of PDF software
 BeOS
 Haiku (operating system)

References

Free PDF readers